Puzhou railway station is a railway station in Yongji, Yuncheng, Shanxi, China. It is an intermediate stop on the Datong–Puzhou railway. It formerly handled passengers, but is now used exclusively for freight.

History
The railway station opened in 1936 and was originally called Yongji. Its name was changed to Puzhou in 1957. Passenger services ceased in the late 1980s.

References 

Railway stations in Shanxi
Railway stations in China opened in 1936